Aiyepe Olode is a town in Osun State, Nigeria, located on the road between Ondo and Ife.

Etymology
Aiyepe Olode derives from the world "Hunters-Garage".

History
Aiyepe Olode was built during the reign of Ademiluyi Ajagun (1910—1930). The settlement was created as a way to link the wilderness to other parts of Ife by Ajani Anibijuwon Omisore.
Omisore made the hunters sign an agreement to pay royalties to him. The settlement grew in fame as Ife elites came in and joined Omisore, with each getting a partition of the wilderness.
In 2021, electricity was promised to restored to the town after 10 years without electricity.

References

Cities in Nigeria